Barbe-Therese Marchand (1745 -fl. 1792), was a French journalist and editor. She was the director and chief editor of the Affiches d'Artois of Arras in 1789–1792.

Her newspaper became known for its opposition against the Jacobins, and she came to be in conflict with Maximilien Robespierre and Charlotte Robespierre. She discontinued her paper and left the country in 1792 in fear of political persecution.

References 

18th-century French women writers
18th-century French journalists
18th-century French newspaper publishers (people)
French women editors
Newspaper editors of the French Revolution
18th-century French businesswomen
18th-century women journalists